Prof Charles René Zeiller HFRSE (14 January 1847, in Nancy – 27 November 1915, in Paris) was a French mining engineer and paleobotanist.

Life

He studied at the École Polytechnique (1865–67) and at the École nationale supérieure des mines (1867–70), where from 1878 onward, he taught classes in paleobotany. In 1911 he was appointed vice-president of the Conseil général des mines.

In 1881 he became a member of the Société botanique de France, later serving as its vice-president (1898) and president (1899 and 1904). In 1893 he was named president of the Société géologique de France and from 1901 to 1915, was a member of the Académie des Sciences (botanical section).

The paleobotanical genera Zeilleria, Zeillerisporites and Zeilleropteris commemorate his name.

Selected works 
 Végétaux fossiles du terrain houiller de la France, 1880.
 Notes sur la flore bouillère des Asturies, 1882.
 Flore fossile (with Bernhard Renault), 1888–89. 
 Étude sur la constitution de l'appareil fructificateur des Sphenophyllum, 1893.
 Éléments de paléobotanique, 1900.
 Flore fossile des gîtes de charbon du Tonkin, 1902.

References

External links 
 IDREF.fr Extensive bibliography

1847 births
1915 deaths
People from Nancy, France
19th-century French botanists
French paleontologists
French mining engineers
Paleobotanists
Presidents of Société géologique de France
20th-century French botanists